Noctis (Latin for "of the night") is a space flight simulation video game for Microsoft Windows released in 2000 by Italian programmer Alessandro Ghignola. It centers around first-person visual exploration of the fictional Feltyrion galaxy, which is presented as being approximately 90 thousand light-years in radius — double that of the nonfictional Milky Way Galaxy — and containing over 78 billion stars, many of which host star systems with exoplanets and natural satellites.

Gameplay 
Players take the role of a silent protagonist pilot operating a Stardrifter, a fictional spacecraft capable of instantaneous interstellar travel. This mode of transportation acts as a primary game mechanic wherein players may approach various star systems both to refuel their vehicle utilizing lithium ions ejected from stars, and to physically land their vehicle on exoplanetary surfaces — barring gas giants, substellar objects, and what the game identifies as unstable worlds — and then explore them. The explorable locales in the game feature a variety of procedurally-generated atmospheres, climates, flora, fauna, and ruins.

Players are not presented with a specified goal or win condition, and are instead encouraged to catalogue and annotate discoveries they make during gameplay. These notes are then stored in a common database of stellar bodies called the GUIDE, which was manually synchronized and made accessible by other players via updates. These GUIDE updates were originally provided manually by Ghignola, who regularly compiled new versions based on emailed submissions of players, and allowed the compilation to be downloaded using an in-game "Inbox" feature. Ghignola ceased making GUIDE updates from 2005 to 2008, before resuming this service.

Development
Alessandro Ghignola began creating Noctis in 1996. Noctis versions I-IV were written in C and Assembly.

Noctis I through III (which were simply titled Noctis until the release of Noctis IV) are still available and contain features that were abandoned with later releases.

Noctis IV, NICE 
Noctis was originally written for MS-DOS and uses a fixed display resolution of 320 x 200, and an upper limit imposed on the walking distance from a planetary landing site (this restriction does not necessarily limit the player's ability to traverse the planet, as players may freely take off and land elsewhere to continue their exploration). These limitations do not apply to the Feltyrion galaxy itself.

The current version of the game is called Noctis IV. In the release of Noctis IV, Ghignola included a facility to have planet names and notes sent back to him and then compiled into the GUIDE. Players could then share their findings with others, and a community of explorers soon developed, utilizing the Noctis forums as the primary method of communication. This community often vied for a wide range of notable discoveries, such as the planetary system with the most planets or the biggest tree in the Noctis universe.

The source code for Noctis IV was released to the public in 2003 under the WTOF Public License, which has led to the creation of a fan-made "mod" to the game called Noctis IV CE (commonly abbreviated NICE). NICE includes bug fixes and additional features which increase the playability compared to Noctis IV. The terrain generation code has also been altered in the NICE version - this renders many remarks made in the GUIDE for Noctis IV largely invalid when used in NICE.

Future version (Noctis V) 
A future version of Noctis (tentatively named Noctis V or Noctis NoVa, and sometimes abbreviated as simply NoVa) was under development as of October 11th, 2001. Noctis V is intended to relieve the walking distance restrictions of the current Noctis platform (as described above) due to the new version of Noctis is being developed in Linoleum, a low-level programming language created by Ghignola that is currently being shaped to better suit Noctis. Because Noctis and Linoleum are being constructed simultaneously, Noctis V's development has been slowed significantly.

Screenshots and details have been revealed by the developer indicating that the game's rendering engine has been completely redone from scratch, with Ghignola first having attempted to simply translate the Noctis IV engine into Linoleum before giving up and rewriting it. Ghignola has also mentioned experimenting with weather and particle effects, possibly including weather such as snow and dust storms in the game.

There is no set release date for Noctis V, but Ghignola has repeatedly assured the game community that he has not given up on the project and has no intention of doing so. The most recent statement was released in an interview with Videogame Potpourri on May 9th, 2012, where Ghignola stated "[Noctis V] keeps living in a corner of my mind, on a sort of unwritten post-it note. But it's there, ready to strike as soon as it gets an opportunity to incarnate."

Reception 
The game gained popularity in the early 2000's after receiving a very favorable review in Home of the Underdogs's list of worthwhile free games. Noctis earned a score of 9.43 out of 10 as well as the site's "Top Dog" award. The reviewer noted amongst other things the magnitude of the galaxy to explore and the total size of the simulator, which is less than one megabyte. An in-detail article by The Escapist's Phillip Scuderi noted the philosophical depth of Noctis in 2006.

Around the release of action-adventure game No Man's Sky in 2016, multiple outlets compared it to Noctis, noting that both games featured exploration of a large, procedurally-generated galaxy, and the ability to share discoveries with other players online. Noctis was described as having a distinct sense of strangeness and beauty, though being difficult to run on modern computers and with a cumbersome user interface.

References

External links 
 
 
 Article on Noctis at The Escapist

2000 video games
DOS games
Space flight simulator games
Windows games
Video games developed in Italy
Video games set on fictional planets
 Video games with available source code
Video games using procedural generation